Charles James Melrose (13 September 1913 – 5 July 1936) was an Australian aviator who held a number of flying records, and was the youngest and only solo flier to finish the Melbourne (MacRobertson) Centenary Air Race in 1934.

History
Jimmy was a son of James Melrose of Wangaraleednie Station, Franklin Harbor, near Cowell, South Australia, a member of the wealthy pastoral family headed by George Melrose (1806–1894) of "Rosebank", Mount Pleasant. His mother, Hilda Westley Melrose, née Billing, was the second wife of James Melrose, who died a few months before Jimmy's 10th birthday. Jimmy was educated at St. Peter's College and took his first flying lessons at Parafield while still at school, gaining his pilot's licence at age 19.

He flew a DH80A Puss Moth registered VH-UQO and christened "My Hildergarde" to England just after his 21st birthday to compete in the race, reaching Croydon in 8 days, 9 hours; a record. He finished the race in 10 days, 16 hours: earning sixth place, second on handicap, the youngest and only solo flier to complete the course. He also owned a Leopard Moth, a faster plane that could not be made ready in time for the race. He gained much assistance from his uncle, Noel Billing, founder of the Supermarine company.

In November 1935 he was again returning to Australia in a Percival Gull Four registered VH-UVH christened "Westley" when he helped in the unsuccessful search for Sir Charles Kingsford Smith around the Bay of Bengal. Melrose had been the last person to sight Kingsford Smith's Lockheed Altair in the night air as it flew above him. A public appeal to reward him financially was decried by his uncle Sir John Melrose, pointing out that the family could well afford to support Jimmy's hobby. Australia was at that time in the grip of the Great Depression.

On his return from the Air Race Melrose was considering giving up racing and turning his mind to commencing an air taxi service the likes of which were virtually non-existent in the mid-1930s.

Death 

He died in July 1936, at the age of 22, when his new high-wing monoplane "Billing", a Heston Phoenix registration VH-AJM, broke up in turbulence over South Melton, Victoria on a charter flight from Melbourne to Darwin. His unfortunate passenger was mining manager Lt. Col Alexander George Campbell, DSO. Two days later, over one hundred thousand people lined the streets of Melbourne to pay their last respects to this fine young flier.

Legacy 

Melrose Park in New South Wales and Melrose Park in South Australia are both suburbs named after him, as well as James Melrose Road, which travels along the southern boundary of Adelaide Airport.  The town of Mildenhall, Suffolk, UK, where the 1934 Air Race originated, has also named a street after him – Charles Melrose Close.

A monument to his memory was erected at Stirling, South Australia, and has been recently renovated. He spent much of his childhood, before the death of his father, at "Glenwood" in nearby Aldgate.  A memorial plaque marks the family home at 13 South Esplanade, Glenelg, which was their winter residence from around 1916, then later their only home.

References

Sources
Gunton, Eric The Jimmy Melrose Story, Australia's Youngest Air Ace. Published by the author 1990. 
Blake, Helen Boy Phoenix, C James Melrose. Angus and Robertson 2008.

External links 
 Australian Dictionary of Biography
 Photograph from the National Library of Australia
 Tom Campbell Black Co-winner of the 1934 London to Melbourne Air Race
 75th. Anniversary of the 1934 London to Melbourne Air Race
 http://jimmymelrose.com

1913 births
1936 deaths
Accidental deaths in Victoria (Australia)
Australian aviation record holders
Aviators killed in aviation accidents or incidents in Australia
Victims of aviation accidents or incidents in 1936